Charlotte Moss is an American interior designer and author. She studied English at Virginia Commonwealth University. In 2009, she received the Elle Décor Vision Award, and in 2010, she was the recipient of the Timeless Design Award from the Royal Oak Foundation. She has written 11 books.

Early life
Charlotte Moss was born in Richmond, Virginia. She is the oldest of five children. Her father was an Army colonel, her mother was a stay-at-home mom, and her grandmother was employed at the local department store selling china.

Career
Charlotte Moss founded her interior design business in 1985. She has decorated private homes across the United States and Europe. Previous clients include Susan and Michael Bloomberg.

In 2007, she opened the Charlotte Moss Townhouse, a showroom in Manhattan's Upper East Side.

Charlotte Moss has partnered with design companies to create licensed collections. She has designed furniture and wallcoverings for Brunschwig & Fils, fabrics and trims for Fabricut, fine china for Pickard China, furniture and upholstery for Century Furniture, carpet for Stark, home fragrances for Agraria, and framed decorative art for Soicher-Marin, pillows with Eastern Accents, clothing with IBU Movement, and cuff bracelets with P.E. Guerin Hardware.

Moss was the guest editor of the House Beautiful November 2013 issue.

Awards and honorary degree
Charlotte Moss was named an Elle Décor A-List Designer, a Traditional Home Top-20 Design Icon, and made the Traditional Home list of the World's Top 20 Interior Designers. In addition, she received Elle Décor's Vision Award in 2009, the Timeless Design Award from the Royal Oak Foundation in 2010, and the 2012 Circle of Excellence Award in Interior Design from the International Furnishings & Design Association (IFDA). She received an honorary doctorate degree from The New York School of Interior Design. Moss also received the 2013 Bone Marrow Foundation Brandon Tartikoff award. On December 2, 2014, she was one of three honorees at the American Hospital of Paris Foundation's Annual Gala in New York.

Philanthropy and boards
Charlotte Moss's philanthropic endeavors include Parrish Art Museum, UNICEF, Operation Smile, and the New York City Ballet. Charlotte is a Trustee of Thomas Jefferson Foundation at Monticello, The Bone Marrow Foundation, American Corporate Partners, The Madoo Conservancy, a member of the International Council of Hillwood Estate, Museum and Gardens, and on the Advisory Board of The New York School of Interior Design where she holds an Honorary Doctorate Degree.

Books
To date, Charlotte Moss has authored 11 books.

 A Passion for Detail (1991)
 Creating A Room (1995)
 The Poetry of Home (1998)
 Design Inspirations (2004)
 Winter House (2005)
 A Flair for Living (2008)
 Charlotte Moss Decorates (2011)
 A Visual Life: Scrapbooks, Collages and Inspirations (2013)
 Charlotte Moss: Garden Inspirations (2015)
 Charlotte Moss Entertains (2018)
 Charlotte Moss Flowers (2021)

References

Year of birth missing (living people)
Living people
American women interior designers
Virginia Commonwealth University
American interior designers
American women writers
21st-century American women